Abacetus treichi is a species of ground beetle in the subfamily Pterostichinae. It was described by Alluaud in 1935.

References

treichi
Beetles described in 1935